San Antonio Regional Hospital (SARH) is an acute, full service medical center in Upland, California.

San Antonio Regional Hospital in Upland, California is a 363-bed, nonprofit, acute care hospital that combines excellent clinical care with exceptional compassion. The award-winning hospital offers a comprehensive range of general medical and surgical services, along with the latest technological advances in cardiac care, cancer care, orthopedics, neurosciences, women’s health, maternity and neonatal care, and emergency services. Founded in 1907, with only 18 beds and 5 physicians, San Antonio Regional Hospital is continually growing with its community and is now recognized as a premier regional medical facility with satellite locations across the rapidly expanding Inland Empire. Given its broad geographic reach and the depth and breadth of its services and programs, supported by the latest medical science and technology, San Antonio is a hospital of the future, offering state-of-the-art healthcare services in a healing environment focused on the patient and family. 

SARH also owns several satellite facilities throughout the surrounding community including Rancho San Antonio Medical Plaza in the city of Rancho Cucamonga, California, Sierra San Antonio Medical Plaza in the city of Fontana, California, and Eastvale San Antonio Medical Plaza in the city of Eastvale, California. 

 
 
 

Hospitals in San Bernardino County, California
Upland, California